Jeffrey Doucette (born November 25, 1947) is an American character actor. Growing up in Milwaukee, Wisconsin, he was the second of eight children born to Elizabeth (Betty Andres) and William (Bill) Doucette. Jeffrey attended Marquette University High School and Lewis University in Romeoville, Illinois, where he became the first theater major and helped build the theater and theater program. He studied theater and graduated from Northern Illinois University.

In 1974, Doucette moved to Chicago and joined the Second City Touring Company, where he met his future comedy partner, Ernst Emling, and formed the comedy duo Jeff and Ernst. Within two months, the pair were signed by the William Morris Agency and toured the country with folk singer Bob Gibson. 

They opened in larger venues for acts including Barry Manilow and The Spinners. In 1976, Doucette and Emling moved to Los Angeles and joined other young comics in building the foundation for the comedy boom of the 1980s, such as Freddie Prinze; Jay Leno; David Letterman; Richard Lewis; Robin Williams; Michael Keaton; Jim Varney; and Andy Kaufman. After many appearances on variety and talk shows, the pair made their first appearance on The Tonight Show Starring Johnny Carson in 1977.

Doucette has appeared in over 92 films and television series, including Splash, All The Way, The Dentist 2, Desperate Housewives, Weird Science, Newhart, Alien Nation, Townies, Dog With A Blog, 3rd Rock from the Sun, ER, That '70s Show and Beverly Hills 90210. He has been a voice artist in many television commercials and cartoons.

Doucette was the main antagonist in the Bollywood film Hisss and appeared in the Disney World attraction Cranium Command.

In television commercials, Doucette has portrayed Benjamin Franklin in ads for Chevrolet Volt: Quicken Loans; Ballpark's Finest Hot Dogs; and El Monterrey breakfast foods. He also made a special appearance as Franklin on Mike & Molly.

Doucette is also a writer and director, having written two plays: Big Head Women, a science-fiction comedy; and Without Annette, an improvisational comedy written with actress and writer Hope Juber and published by Playscripts, Inc. in 2015.

In 1991, Doucette received the Los Angeles Drama Critics Circle Award for Best Lead Performance for "Rage, or I'll Be Home For Christmas" at the Alliance Theater in Burbank. In 2014, he received the Lifetime Achievement Award from the International Student Film Festival Hollywood (ISFFH).

Doucette and his wife, Saba, are licensed spiritual practitioners in the United Centers for Spiritual Living; they are active as teachers, counselors and teen and ‘tween group leaders. His Life Play seminars and workshops focus on improvisation as a path for spiritual and self-discovery.

Filmography

Live action roles

Film

Television

Voice roles

Film

Television

References

External links

1947 births
Living people
American male film actors
American male television actors
American male voice actors
Male actors from Milwaukee